is a former member of the Japanese idol girl group NMB48. She was a member of NMB48's Team N.

Biography 
Jonishi passed NMB48's 1st generation auditions in September 2010. Her audition song was SCANDAL's Shunkan Sentimental. Her debut was on October 9, 2010. In March 2011, she was selected to Team N. Her first NMB48 Senbatsu was the single Zetsumetsu Kurokami Shōjo. Prior to joining NMB48, she has no experience in singing or dancing.

On the 2013 general elections, Jonishi ranked for the first time, placing 40th with 17,381 votes.

In February 2014, during AKB48's Group Shuffle, Jonishi was appointed the vice-captain of Team N. In 2014, she ranked at 58th with 14,194 votes in the group's general elections. In 2015, she ranked at 36th with 21,135 votes in that.

On April 18, 2017, Jonishi graduated from the group's Team N.

Discography

NMB48 singles

AKB48 singles

External links
 NMB48 Official Profile
 Official Blog
 Kei Jonishi on Google+
 Kei Jonishi on Twitter
 Jonishi Kei on Stage48

References

1995 births
Living people
Japanese idols
Japanese women pop singers
People from Shiga Prefecture
Musicians from Shiga Prefecture
NMB48 members